Archibald Clifton Wilson (November 25, 1923 – April 28, 2007) was a professional baseball player. He played parts of two seasons in Major League Baseball for three teams from 1951 to 1952, primarily as an outfielder. He was born in Los Angeles. He attended and graduated from Franklin High School in Los Angeles.

In 1951, Wilson was elected the International League MVP while playing for the Buffalo Bisons. He later would be inducted in the International League Hall of Fame.

Wilson entered the majors late in the year with the New York Yankees, playing for them in part of two seasons before being traded along with Jackie Jensen and Spec Shea to the Washington Senators in the same transaction that brought Irv Noren to the Yankees. His stay in Washington was brief because he was sent to the Boston Red Sox in exchange for Ken Wood.

In a 51-game Major League career, Wilson was a .221 hitter (31-for-140) with nine runs, five doubles, three triples, and 17 RBI without any home runs. After his Major League career, he returned to the minor leagues, where he played until 1962, including seven seasons for Triple-A Toronto Maple Leafs.

Wilson died in Decatur, Alabama, at the age of 83.

Sources

1923 births
2007 deaths
American expatriate baseball players in Canada
Baltimore Orioles (IL) players
Baseball players from California
Boston Red Sox players
Buffalo Bisons (minor league) players
California Golden Bears baseball players
Charleston Senators players
Cienfuegos players
International League MVP award winners
Kansas City Blues (baseball) players
Louisville Colonels (minor league) players
Major League Baseball outfielders
Minor league baseball managers
New York Yankees players
Pensacola Senators players
San Francisco Seals (baseball) players
Toronto Maple Leafs (International League) players
USC Trojans baseball players
Ventura Yankees players
Victoria Athletics players
Washington Senators (1901–1960) players
American expatriate baseball players in Cuba
20th-century African-American sportspeople
21st-century African-American people